Thomas Blenkinsop may refer to:

Thomas Blenkinsop (MP) for Westmorland (UK Parliament constituency)
Tom Blenkinsop (born 1980), English politician

See also
Tommy Blenkinsopp (1920–2004), English footballer (Middlesbrough FC)